Jen Richards  is a transgender American writer, actress, producer and activist.

Life and career
Richards was born in Mississippi and resides in North Carolina. She graduated from Shimer College with a BA in Philosophy, and studied at Oxford University.

In 2015, she appeared as a supporting cast member of Caitlyn Jenner's reality show I Am Cait. In 2016, she co-starred, co-directed, co-wrote and co-produced the web series Her Story, which was nominated for an Emmy Award. Richards also co-produced the series More Than T and wrote the Trans 102 series.

Richards joined the cast of the television series Nashville in 2017. She became the first openly transgender person to appear on a CMT show, playing the first transgender character to appear on that network. Richards also appeared in the 2017 film Easy Living.

In June 2017, Richards wrote and appeared in a video open letter, presented by ScreenCrush and GLAAD, featuring trans actors asking for better representation in film and television.

In August 2018, HBO announced a series pickup of Tom Perrotta's Mrs. Fletcher, a half-hour comedy based on Perrotta's 2017 novel of the same name; Richards is cast as Margo Fairchild, a transgender community college writing teacher, as a series regular.

Personal life 
Richards is bisexual. In August 2020, she announced her engagement to Rebekah Cheyne, a professor from Arizona State University.

Filmography

Television

Film

References

External links
 
 
 

Living people
Bisexual women
Actresses from Mississippi
Shimer College alumni
American television writers
American television producers
American women television producers
American film actresses
American television actresses
American screenwriters
Transgender actresses
Year of birth missing (living people)
LGBT people from Mississippi
American women television writers
American LGBT screenwriters
LGBT producers
Bisexual actresses
21st-century American actresses
21st-century American screenwriters
21st-century American women writers
American bisexual actors
American transgender writers
American bisexual writers